Octetra is a concrete sculpture by Isamu Noguchi (1904–1988) from 1968.

Description
It is an abstract painted concrete sculpture. It was designed to be a play structure.

History
It was first exhibited near Spoleto Cathedral

There are examples at Robert T. Webb Sculpture Garden, Takamatsu Japan, Moerenuma Park.

It was shown at the Pace Gallery.

References

Outdoor sculptures in Italy
1968 sculptures
Concrete sculptures